Kevin Simone Sessa (born 6 July 2000) is a German professional footballer who plays as a midfielder for 1. FC Heidenheim.

Personal life
Sessa is of Argentine descent through his father. His older brother Nicolás is also a footballer.

References

2000 births
Living people
German people of Argentine descent
People from Fellbach
Sportspeople from Stuttgart (region)
Sportspeople of Argentine descent
German footballers
Argentine footballers
Footballers from Baden-Württemberg
Association football midfielders
2. Bundesliga players
1. FC Heidenheim players